Pie is an unincorporated community in Mingo County, West Virginia, United States. According to Pie's 1933 postmaster, the community was named for Leander Blankenship, a resident "who really like[d] pie, regardless of kind".

Gallery

References

External links

Unincorporated communities in Mingo County, West Virginia
Unincorporated communities in West Virginia